The Rumson Stakes is an American Thoroughbred horse race held at Monmouth Park Racetrack in Oceanport, New Jersey. Currently, the race is open to horses age three and older and is contested on dirt at a distance of five furlongs. It offers a purse of $75,000.

The race is named for the community of Rumson in Monmouth County, New Jersey.

Winners of the Rumson Stakes since 1997

References

 The 2008 Rumson Stakes at NJ.com

Flat horse races for three-year-olds
Horse races in New Jersey
Ungraded stakes races in the United States
Monmouth Park Racetrack